Caldilinea aerophila is a species of filamentous thermophilic bacteria, and the type species of its genus. It is Gram-negative, non-spore-forming, with type strain STL-6-O1T (=JCM 11388T =DSM 14525T).

See also
Bioaugmentation

References

Further reading
Costello, Elizabeth Kate. Molecular Phylogenetic Characterization of High Altitude Soil Microbial Communities and Novel, Uncultivated Bacterial Lineages. ProQuest, 2007.
Dilek, Yıldırım. Links Between Geological Processes, Microbial Activities & Evolution of Life: Microbes and Geology. Eds. Yildirim Dilek, H. Furnes, and Karlis Muehlenbachs. Vol. 4. Springer, 2008.

External links

LPSN
Type strain of Caldilinea aerophila at BacDive -  the Bacterial Diversity Metadatabase

Gram-negative bacteria
Thermophiles
Chloroflexota
Bacteria described in 2003